Frontier Airlines was a United States airline formed by a merger of Arizona Airways, Challenger Airlines, and Monarch Airlines on June 1, 1950. Headquartered at the now-closed Stapleton Airport in Denver, Colorado, the airline ceased operations on August 24, 1986. A new airline was founded eight years later in 1994 using the same name.

History
The original Frontier Airlines dates to November 27, 1946, when Monarch Air Lines began service in the Four Corners states of Colorado, Utah, New Mexico, and Arizona. Frontier served cities in the Rocky Mountains bounded by Salt Lake City to the west, Billings to the north, Denver to the east, and Phoenix and El Paso to the south.

In 1950, it flew to 40 cities in the Rocky Mountain region with twelve Douglas DC-3s and 400 employees. Before ceasing operations in 1986, it flew to more than 170 airports at various times over the years, with service to both the U.S. east coast and west coast as well as to Canada and Mexico with an all-jet fleet.

Frontier continued to operate Douglas DC-3s and added Convair CV-340s beginning in 1959; the company introduced a new logo on the new aircraft. On June 1, 1964, it was the first airline to fly the Convair 580, a CV-340/440 retrofitted with GM Allison turboprops. It had 50 seats, was flown by two pilots and carried one flight attendant. (The aircraft could have carried 53 passengers, but that would have required a second flight attendant.) The CV-580 was the workhouse of the Frontier fleet until the introduction of the Boeing 737-200s in the early 1970s. In later years de Havilland Canada DHC-6 Twin Otters and Beech 99s were added to serve cities too small for the Convair 580.

In May 1958, Frontier flew to 40 airports; two years later it flew to 69. Half the additions had never seen an airline and several never would again, after Frontier pulled out. In May 1968, after merging with Central Airlines, Frontier flew to 100 airports, second among U.S. airlines (Pan Am was first with 122).

In April 1958, Lewis Bergman "Bud" Maytag, Jr. (grandson of Frederick Louis Maytag I, founder of the Maytag Corporation), acquired controlling interest in Frontier. After all governmental approvals, he took control in January 1959 as chairman of the board and president.  Three years later, Maytag sold his stock in March 1962 to the Goldfield Corp.; Lewis W. Dymond then became president of Frontier and, under his guidance, the airline entered the jet age with new Boeing 727-100s on September 30, 1966. The Boeing trijet was called the "Arrow-Jet" by the airline. The Boeing 727-200 became part of the fleet in February 1968.

On October 1, 1967, Frontier purchased Central Airlines, headquartered in Fort Worth, Texas. The addition of Central added eleven Convair 600s and sixteen DC-3s to the fleet and many new cities. Convair 600s were Convair 240s that had been retrofitted with Rolls-Royce Dart turboprop engines; Frontier phased out the Convair 600s in 1969–70 and DC-3 flights ended in 1968. The Convair 580s lasted until May 31, 1982, when they were parked and eventually sold.

Alvin Feldman became president in March 1971 and converted the jet fleet to Boeing 737-200s, eliminating the 727s. The 737-200 was Frontier's only jet type until McDonnell Douglas MD-80s were added beginning May 20, 1982.

On January 29, 1973, Frontier Airlines hired its first black pilot, Bob Ashby, the only Tuskegee Airman to become a commercial passenger airline pilot. It also hired the first female pilot for any modern day U.S. commercial airline the same day, Emily Howell Warner. Both were awarded their captain's wings several years later.

According to the 1977 Frontier Airlines annual report, the airline was serving both Burbank (BUR) and Orange County (SNA) via an interchange flight agreement with Hughes Airwest with service between these southern California destinations and the Frontier hub in Denver (DEN) and had also begun serving Sacramento (SMF), its first directly served destination in California, that same year.  Frontier would later introduce its own Orange County service as well as flights to a number of other destinations in California.  This same annual report states the airline transported over 80 percent of its passenger traffic on board its growing fleet of Boeing 737-200 jets in 1977.

The final Frontier logo, a stylized "F", was created by Saul Bass and introduced April 30, 1978. By 1979, the airline had 5,100 employees and operated 35 Boeing 737-200 and 25 Convair 580 aircraft serving 94 cities in 26 states, Canada and Mexico.

On February 1, 1980, Frontier president Al Feldman left to become the CEO of Continental Airlines. He was succeeded by Glen Ryland, and the airline started to decline. By 1982, employees began accepting lower wages and benefits in an effort to keep the business viable. Ryland resigned November 6, 1984, and was replaced by M.C. "Hank" Lund, the well-known vice president. Joe O'Gorman, from United Airlines, took over in May 1985, giving rise to speculation that United would buy Frontier.

Once the last of the Convair 580 turboprops were retired, Frontier became an all-jet airline on June 1, 1982. The airline operated Boeing 737-200s to smaller cities such as Casper, Wyoming; Durango, Colorado; Farmington, New Mexico; Fort Smith, Arkansas; Grand Forks, North Dakota; Lawton, Oklahoma; Manhattan, Kansas; Montrose, Colorado; Rock Springs, Wyoming; Salina, Kansas; Scottsbluff, Nebraska; Stockton, California; Topeka, Kansas; and West Yellowstone, Montana. By the fall of 1983 some Convair 580's were revived when an agreement was made with Combs Airways to operate a code sharing feeder service for Frontier called Frontier Commuter. This carrier began service on October 17, 1983, to some of the Frontier cities that were too small to support 737s plus new service to several cities such as Idaho Falls and Pocatello, Idaho, Gillette and Sheridan, Wyoming, and Pierre and Aberdeen, South Dakota. Frontier Commuter was short lived and shut down on January 14, 1985.

In January 1984 Boeing 727-100s made a short-lived reappearance when Frontier created a wholly owned "airline within an airline" low cost subsidiary: Frontier Horizon. Its formation was bitterly opposed by Frontier Airlines employees. During its brief existence, Boeing 727s formerly operated by American Airlines flew nonstop between Denver and New York LaGuardia Airport (LGA), Washington Dulles International Airport (IAD), Chicago O'Hare International Airport (ORD), San Francisco International Airport (SFO), Orlando (MCO) and Tampa (TPA). Frontier Horizon ceased operations in April 1985 after it was acquired by a new start up air carrier, Skybus Airlines, that same year.

The employees' union coalition struggled to save the airline but failed. People Express Airlines acquired Frontier on October 5, 1985, and put Larry Martin in charge after Joe O'Gorman resigned on January 29, 1986. People Express continued operating Frontier as an independent entity. On August 24, 1986, Frontier shut down due to continued losses and four days later filed for bankruptcy.

On October 24, 1986 Continental Airlines, a Texas Air Corp. unit, acquired People Express Airlines which had acquired Frontier Airlines the year before. Both merged into Continental on February 1, 1987, along with New York Air and several commuter airline subsidiaries including Britt Airways and Provincetown-Boston Airlines (PBA). Frontier's failure doomed People Express, New York Air, and several commuter air carriers. It would take years to settle the pension disputes and lawsuits. Efforts were still being made in 2013 to settle ESOP accounts. Continental continued to operate the Frontier jet fleet with the aircraft being repainted in Continental's livery. On March 3, 2012, Continental merged into United Airlines.

Frontier's last timetable was dated September 3, 1986; the airline had halted operations and filed bankruptcy the week before. Some bankruptcy proceedings ended on May 31, 1990, forty years after Frontier was formed, but the Chapter 11 case was closed July 22, 1998, by Charles E. Matheson, Chief Judge.

M. C. "Hank" Lund and other former Frontier executives went on to start a new airline, also named Frontier Airlines, which began Boeing 737 flights on July 5, 1994.

During its 36 years, Frontier Airlines flew to over 170 airports; however, not all were served at the same time and many no longer have airline service.

Fleet 

 Beech 99
 Boeing 727-100
 Boeing 727-200
 Boeing 737-200
 Convair 340
 Convair 440
 Convair 580
 Convair 600 (formerly operated by Central Airlines)
 de Havilland Canada DHC-6 Twin Otter
 Douglas DC-3
 McDonnell Douglas MD-80

According to the July 1, 1968 Frontier Airlines system timetable, Aero Commander 500 twin engine prop aircraft were being operated via contract by Combs Aviation on behalf of Frontier on scheduled passenger flights serving smaller communities in Montana and Wyoming at this time.

Destinations
Frontier served the following destinations between 1950 and 1986 with not all of these destinations being served at the same time.  Destinations in bold received jet service.
 Abilene, Texas
 Ainsworth, Nebraska
Alamogordo, New Mexico - Alamogordo Municipal Airport
 Alamosa, Colorado
Albuquerque, New Mexico - Albuquerque International Sunport
 Alliance, Nebraska
 Amarillo, Texas
 Atlanta, Georgia
 Bartlesville, Oklahoma
 Beatrice, Nebraska
 Billings, Montana
 Bismarck, North Dakota
 Boise, Idaho
 Borger, Texas
 Bozeman, Montana
 Burbank, California - served via an interchange flight agreement with Hughes Airwest 
 Canon City, Colorado
 Casper, Wyoming
 Chadron, Nebraska
 Cheyenne, Wyoming
 Chicago, Illinois - Chicago Midway International Airport
 Chicago, Illinois - Chicago O'Hare International Airport
 Clifton, Arizona
 Cody, Wyoming
 Colorado Springs, Colorado - Colorado Springs Airport
 Columbus, Nebraska
 Columbus, Ohio
 Cortez, Colorado
 Dallas, Texas - Love Field (DAL)
 Dallas/Ft. Worth, Texas - Dallas/Fort Worth International Airport (DFW)
 Deming, New Mexico
 Denver, Colorado - Stapleton International Airport (now closed)  - Primary Hub
 Des Moines, Iowa
 Detroit, Michigan
 Dickinson, North Dakota
 Dodge City, Kansas
 Douglas/Bisbee, Arizona
 Douglas, Wyoming
 Duncan, Oklahoma
 Durango, Colorado
 El Paso, Texas - El Paso International Airport
 Enid, Oklahoma
 Eugene, Oregon
 Fargo, North Dakota
 Farmington, New Mexico - Four Corners Regional Airport
 Fayetteville, Arkansas
 Flagstaff, Arizona
 Ft. Leonard Wood, Missouri
 Ft. Smith, Arkansas
 Ft. Worth, Texas - Greater Southwest International Airport - (no longer exists)
 Fresno, California
Gallup, New Mexico - Gallup Municipal Airport
 Glasgow, Montana
 Glendive, Montana
 Goodland, Kansas
 Grand Forks, North Dakota
 Grand Island, Nebraska
 Grand Junction, Colorado
 Great Bend, Kansas
 Great Falls, Montana
 Greeley, Colorado
 Greybull, Wyoming
 Guadalajara, Mexico
 Gunnison, Colorado
 Guymon, Oklahoma
 Harrison, Arkansas
 Hastings, Nebraska
 Hayden, Colorado - Frontier served Steamboat Springs, CO via Yampa Valley Airport near Hayden
 Hays, Kansas
 Havre, Montana
 Helena, Montana
 Hot Springs, Arkansas
 Houston, Texas - Hobby Airport
 Hutchinson, Kansas
 Idaho Falls, Idaho
 Imperial, Nebraska
 Indianapolis, Indiana
 Ixtapa/Zihuatanejo, Mexico
 Jackson, Mississippi
 Jackson, Wyoming
 Joplin, Missouri
 Kalispell, Montana
 Kansas City, Missouri - Kansas City International Airport
 Kansas City, Missouri - Kansas City Municipal Airport
 Kearney, Nebraska
 Lamar, Colorado
 Laramie, Wyoming
Las Cruces, New Mexico - Las Cruces International Airport
 Las Vegas, Nevada — McCarran International Airport
 Lawton, Oklahoma
 Lemmon, South Dakota
 Lewistown, Montana
 Lexington, Kentucky
 Liberal, Kansas
 Lincoln, Nebraska
 Little Rock, Arkansas
 Lordsburg, New Mexico
 Los Angeles, California - Los Angeles International Airport
 Lusk, Wyoming
 Madison, Wisconsin
 Manhattan, Kansas - Manhattan Regional Airport
 Manzanillo, Mexico
 Mazatlan, Mexico
 McAlester, Oklahoma
 McCook, Nebraska
 Memphis, Tennessee
 Midland/Odessa, Texas
 Miles City, Montana
 Milwaukee, Wisconsin
 Minneapolis, Minnesota
 Minot, North Dakota
 Missoula, Montana
 Moab, Utah
 Monte Vista, Colorado
 Montrose, Colorado
 Muskogee, Oklahoma
 Newcastle, Wyoming
 New York City, New York - LaGuardia Airport
 Nogales, Arizona
 Norfolk, Nebraska
 North Platte, Nebraska
 Oakland, California - Oakland International Airport
 Oklahoma City, Oklahoma
 Omaha, Nebraska
 Orange County, California - Orange County Airport - now John Wayne Airport.
 Orlando, Florida - Orlando International Airport
 Palm Springs, California
 Paris, Texas
 Parsons, Kansas
 Pasco, Washington state
 Phoenix, Arizona - Phoenix International Airport
 Ponca City, Oklahoma
 Portland, Oregon - Portland International Airport
 Powell, Wyoming
 Prescott, Arizona
 Price, Utah
 Provo, Utah
 Pueblo, Colorado - Pueblo Memorial Airport
 Puerto Vallarta, Mexico
 Rapid City, South Dakota
 Rawlins, Wyoming
 Redding, California
 Regina, Saskatchewan, Canada
 Reno, Nevada
 Riverton, Wyoming
 Rockford, Illinois
 Rock Springs, Wyoming
 Sacramento, California
 Safford, Arizona
 St. Joseph, Missouri
 St. Louis, Missouri - Saint Louis International Airport
 Salina, Kansas - Salina Municipal Airport
 Salt Lake City, Utah - Salt Lake City International Airport - Secondary Hub / Focus City
 San Diego, California
 San Francisco, California - San Francisco International Airport
Santa Fe, New Mexico - Santa Fe Municipal Airport
 Saskatoon, Saskatchewan, Canada
 Scottsbluff, Nebraska
 Seattle/Tacoma, Washington state - SeaTac International Airport
 Shreveport, Louisiana
 Sidney, Montana
 Sidney, Nebraska
Silver City, New Mexico - Grant County Airport
 Sioux City, Iowa
 Sioux Falls, South Dakota
 Spokane, Washington state
 Springfield, Missouri
 Stillwater, Oklahoma
 Stockton, California
 Tampa, Florida - Tampa International Airport
 Toledo, Ohio
 Topeka, Kansas - Philip Billard Municipal Airport
 Tucson, Arizona - Tucson International Airport
 Tulsa, Oklahoma
 Valentine, Nebraska
 Vancouver, British Columbia, Canada - Vancouver International Airport
 Vernal, Utah
 Washington, D.C. - Dulles International Airport
 West Yellowstone, Montana
 Wichita, Kansas - Wichita Municipal Airport
 Williston, North Dakota
 Winnipeg, Manitoba, Canada
 Winslow, Arizona
 Wolf Point, Montana
 Worland, Wyoming

The above is taken from Frontier timetables.

Accidents and incidents
On April 21, 1957, Frontier Airlines Flight 7, a Douglas DC-3 on a flight from Prescott Regional Airport to Phoenix Sky Harbor International Airport descended and the left wing impacted the side of a mountain ridge at 6400 feet 64 km (40 miles) north of PHX. A portion of the left wing was torn off, but a safe landing was made at PHX. There were no fatalities among the 4 crew and 22 passengers on board. The aircraft was repaired and put back into service.
On December 21, 1962, Frontier Airlines Flight 363, a Convair CV-340 touched down 4061 feet short of Runway 17 in fog at Central Nebraska Regional Airport. The aircraft caught fire but all 3 crew and 39 passengers survived.
On March 12, 1964, Frontier Airlines Flight 32, a Douglas C-47, struck the crest of a 2615 foot high upslope (a few feet below airfield elevation) during a VOR approach to Runway 30 at Miles City Municipal Airport. There was a minimal ceiling, low visibility, icing, and high gusty winds. All 3 crew and 2 passengers were killed.
On July 27, 1966, Frontier Airlines Flight 188, a Douglas C-47 bound for Albuquerque, New Mexico, swerved off the runway and ended up in a ditch at Gallup Municipal Airport. All 3 crew and 13 passengers survived, but the aircraft was damaged beyond repair and written off.
On December 21, 1967, Frontier Airlines Flight 2610, a Douglas C-47 converted to carry cargo, crashed after takeoff from Stapleton International Airport due to the failure of the crew to perform a pre-takeoff control check resulting in takeoff with the elevators immobilized by a control batten. Both occupants were killed.
On April 13, 1972, 36-year-old Mexican immigrant Ricardo Chavez Ortiz, armed with an unloaded .22-caliber pistol, hijacks Frontier Airlines Flight 91, a Boeing 737-200 flying from Albuquerque, New Mexico, to Phoenix, Arizona, with 31 people on board, and orders it to fly past Phoenix and land at Los Angeles, California, where he plans to make a statement about injustices he had experienced in the United States since immigrating from Mexico. At Los Angeles International Airport, he releases the plane's passengers and, after journalists come aboard the airliner, makes a rambling 34-minute speech while wearing a pilot's hat, complaining about police brutality, racism, and education policy. Then he hands his gun to the plane's pilot, apologizes for the day's inconvenience, and surrenders quietly.
On October 20, 1977, a hijacker pulled a shotgun at a Central Nebraska Regional Airport screening point and forced a Frontier Airlines Boeing 737 to fly to Kansas City for refueling and fly again to Hartsfield Jackson Atlanta International Airport. After certain demands were made, the hostages were released in Atlanta, and the hijacker shot and killed himself.
On January 18, 1978, a Frontier Airlines de Havilland Canada DHC-6 Twin Otter 300 on a training flight crashed after takeoff at Pueblo Memorial Airport, the aircraft attained an extreme nose-high attitude, and at 100–150 feet, nosed over and crashed. The flaps were set at 30 degrees instead of the normal setting of 10 degrees. All 3 occupants (2 crew and 1 passenger) were killed.

See also 
 List of defunct airlines of the United States

References
 Jake Lamkins, "Old Frontier Airlines website". http://OldFrontierAirlines.com

External links

 Old Frontier Airlines
 A Photo Website of the "original" Frontier Airlines
  Airline timetables from 1947 to 1962

Airlines established in 1950
Airlines disestablished in 1986
Companies that filed for Chapter 11 bankruptcy in 1986
Companies based in Denver
Defunct airlines of the United States
Defunct companies based in Colorado
RKO General
1950 establishments in Colorado
1986 disestablishments in Colorado
Defunct regional airlines of the United States